The Ninth Square Historic District encompasses a historically diverse and well-preserved part of the commercial area of Downtown New Haven, Connecticut.  The district is bounded by Church, Court, State, and Crown Streets, and is centered on the intersection of Chapel and Orange Streets.  The buildings in the district are mostly late-19th and early 20th commercial buildings, and includes a number of commercial buildings from the first half of the 19th century, a rarity in most of Connecticut's urban downtown areas.  The district was listed on the National Register of Historic Places in 1984.

Ninth Square takes its name from an early division of New Haven, when leaders of the New Haven Colony created a town plan of nine large squares in 1637, centered on the one now housing the New Haven Green.  Because the ninth square was located closest to the colony's harbor, it was the first to develop a significant commercial presence.  In the 1820s, the Farmington Canal was routed near the district, spurring further commercial development.  The conversion of the canal right-of-way to railroad use intensified the area's commercial development in the second half of the 19th century.  All of this resulted in a significant diversity of styles in the commercial buildings seen, generally reflecting architectural styles popular at the time of their construction.  The area declined after World War II, but has been spared from destruction in urban renewal activities of the mid-20th century.

The Ninth Square has been at the center of New Haven's cultural renaissance, densification and renewal over the last decade.

Businesses

Gallery

See also
National Register of Historic Places listings in New Haven, Connecticut

References

External links
New Haven Preservation Trust: Ninth Square Historic District

National Register of Historic Places in New Haven, Connecticut
Italianate architecture in Connecticut
Greek Revival architecture in Connecticut
Historic districts in New Haven County, Connecticut
Historic districts on the National Register of Historic Places in Connecticut